The women's 4 × 100 metre medley relay event at the 2015 European Games in Baku took place on 25 June at the Aquatic Palace.

Results

Heats
The heats were started at 10:56.

Final
The final was held at 20:05.

References

Women's 4 x 100 metre medley relay
2015 in women's swimming